Stephen Alexander Smith  (1958 – November 29, 2022) was a Canadian legal scholar and writer.

Early life and education 

Smith was born in Toronto and earned a Bachelor of Arts degree from Queen's University at Kingston in 1981. Thereafter, he received a law degree from the University of Toronto and then a DPhil from Balliol College, Oxford under the supervision of Joseph Raz.

Legal career 

In 1989, he served as a law clerk for Brian Dickson when he was Chief Justice of Canada.

Academic career 

As an academic, Smith focused on torts law.

He was a former faculty member of St Anne's College, Oxford. He joined McGill University's Faculty of Law in 1998 as an associate professor and was promoted to a full professor in 2004. In 2009, he was named a James McGill Professor in the faculty.

Awards and recognition 

In February 2008, Smith received a Killam Research Fellowship from the Canada Council for the Arts for his project "Court Orders and the Replication, Transformation and Creations of Rights".

He was named New Zealand Law Foundation Distinguished Fellow of 2017 and visited all six New Zealand law faculties in the fall of 2017.

In 2020, he was named to the Royal Society of Canada (Academy of the Social Sciences).

Personal life and death

Smith was married and had 3 children. He died on November 29, 2022, at the age of 64.

Publications 

 Contract Theory (2004)
 Atiyah's Introduction to the Law of Contract, 6th ed (2005)
 Rights, Wrongs, and Injustices: The Structure of Remedial Law (2019)

References

External links
Professor Stephen A. Smith, Faculty of Law, McGill University

1958 births
2022 deaths
Canadian legal writers
Canadian legal scholars
Queen's University at Kingston alumni
University of Toronto alumni
Alumni of Balliol College, Oxford
Academic staff of the McGill University Faculty of Law